Red Glove may refer to:
 The Red Glove, 1919 film serial
 Red Glove (book), 2011 fantasy book